Martirosyan or variants Mardirosian and Mardirossian in Western Armenian and at times Martirosjan is an Armenian surname. It means "son of Martiros" (a martyr in Armenian).

Notable people with the surname include:

Martirosyan
Amasi Martirosyan (born 1897), Armenian film director
Armen Martirosyan (athlete) (born 1969), Armenian triple jumper
Armen Martirosyan (Heritage), Armenian politician
Armen Martirosyan (politician), ambassador to the United Nations for Armenia 
Armen Martirosyan (musician) (born 1963), artistic director and conductor of the Armenian Jazz Band
Arsen Martirosyan (historian), revisionist historian and author of books about the Stalinist period of the USSR
Garik Martirosyan (born 1974), Armenian humorist
Hrach Martirosyan (born 1964), Armenian linguist
Nikolay Martirosyan (born 1982), Armenian-American neurosurgeon
Simon Martirosyan (born 1997), Armenian weightlifter
Tigran Gevorg Martirosyan (born 1988), Armenian weightlifter who competes in the 69 kg category
Tigran Vardan Martirosyan (born 1983), Armenian weightlifter who competes in the 85 kg category
Tigran Martirosyan (tennis) (born 1983), Armenian tennis player
Vanes Martirosyan (born 1986), Armenian-American professional boxer

Martirosian
Arsen Martirosian (born 1977), Armenian super bantamweight boxer

Martirosjan
Sargis Martirosjan (born 1986), Austrian weightlifter

Mardirosian
Haig Mardirosian (born 1947), college dean, concert organist, composer, and conductor
Tom Mardirosian (born 1947), American Armenian actor.

Mardirossian
Garo Mardirossian, Armenian-American attorney
Margaret Mardirossian, Canadian Armenian film producer, founder of Anaid Productions

See also
Armen Martirosyan (disambiguation)
Tigran Martirosyan (disambiguation)

Armenian-language surnames